Utah-based Lendio (formerly Funding Universe), founded in 2011 by Brock Blake and Trent Miskin, is a free online loan marketplace in the U.S. targeting  small business owners.

History
Founded in 2006 as FundingUtah,
, it became FundingUniverse and, by 2011, Lendio. CEO Blake has served in that role to each.

Lending platform
Lendio's platform reviews metrics including the business's financial projections, use of funds, industry, and monthly revenue to find loans option for borrowers. The platform uses a series of questions to predict which loan type will most likely match a business owner's qualifications. Each borrower is also assigned a funding manager to answer questions through the entire process. Lendio's online application process takes an average of 15 minutes to complete, compared with an average 25 hours filling out traditional lending applications.

Small business owners are offered financing options including credit cards, lines of credit, short-term specialty loans and long-term traditional loans.

Loan types
Lendio offers a variety of loans for small business owners, including:

Company growth
Founded in 2011, Lendio facilitated its first loan in Q4 2013. In 2014, it coordinated $12.4 million in funding to more than 400 small business owners. By 2015, the company had expanded to $128 million in financing, helping more than 5,100 small business owners in all 50 states.

In October 2016, Lendio raised $20 million in funding from Comcast Ventures and Stereo Capital with participation from existing investors Napier Park, Blumberg Capital, Tribeca Venture Partners, and North Hill Ventures. By 2016, it had delivered over $250 million in total funding to more than 10,000 small businesses.

In Q2 2018, Lendio reported 90% year-over-year revenue growth. In October 2018, Lendio announced it had serviced $1B of total loans to over 51,000 small businesses across the country, providing $3.8B in economic output.

In Q1 2020, Lendio announced it had secured $55M in a Series E Funding Round.

In the first month of the Paycheck Protection Program during the COVID-19 pandemic, Lendio onboarded hundreds of lenders to help facilitate what would eventually amount to $8 billion in loan approvals for over 100,000 businesses.

Awards
Glassdoor’s Best Places to Work, U.S. Small and Medium Companies, 2021
 EY Entrepreneur Of The Year Utah Region Award winner, 2020
Entrepreneur’s Franchise 500®
Utah Business Fast 50, 2017, 2018, 2019, 2020
The Fintech 250: The Top Fintech Companies Of 2020

Lendio Local and Sunrise 
Launched in early 2017, the Lendio Franchising program is the world's first franchised online lending marketplace; it has since grown to 100 franchise territories nationwide, and facilitated $430 million to over 7,000 small businesses across the U.S.

In 2019, Lendio acquired Billy, renamed to Sunrise, a freemium bookkeeping software program for small businesses that allows them to manage and track cashflow, send invoices and collect payments. An integration with Gusto, allows business owners to complete and track payroll expenses as well.

Partnerships
In April 2018, Lendio announced its lender turndown program, which allows lending partners to offer Lendio's marketplace of loan options to small business owners that do not fit the lender's credit box.

Lendio also works with the following organizations to better serve the small business community:
Comcast Business
Ocrolus

Funding Universe 
Lendio's predecessor, Funding Universe was a pay-to-pitch on Inc.'s list of 'the fastest-growing privately held companies.' They stopped charging "amid the criticism."

The name FundingUniverse was an outgrowth of the FundingUtah that Blake and Miskin began in 2006.

References

Financial services companies established in 2011
American companies established in 2011
Companies based in Salt Lake City